David Walter Galenson (born June 20, 1951) is a professor in the Department of Economics and the College at the University of Chicago, and a Research Associate of the National Bureau of Economic Research. He has been a visiting professor at the California Institute of Technology, Massachusetts Institute of Technology, the University of Texas at Austin, the École des Hautes Études en Sciences Sociales in Paris, and the American University of Paris. He is the Academic Director of the Center for Creativity Economics, which was inaugurated in 2010 at the Universidad del CEMA, Buenos Aires.

He is the son of economists Marjorie and Walter Galenson. He attended Phillips Academy. He then studied at Harvard College for both his undergraduate and graduate education, completing his PhD in 1979.

Contributions 
Galenson is known for postulating a new theory of artistic creativity. Based on a study of the ages at which various innovative artists made their greatest contributions to the field, Galenson's theory divides all artists into two classes: conceptualists, who make radical innovations in their field at a very early age; and experimentalists, whose innovations  develop slowly over a long period of experimentation and refinement. 

Although Galenson initially developed his theory from data solely concerning the visual arts, he has since also investigated conceptual and experimental innovators among poets, novelists, film makers, popular musicians and economists. Elias et al (2020) combines Galenson´s approach with Paul Romer approach to innovation to analize innovations and innovators in the Argentine wine industry.

Among the examples Galenson cites of conceptualists are:
F. Scott Fitzgerald, who wrote The Great Gatsby at 29.
Pablo Picasso, who painted Les Demoiselles d'Avignon at 26.
Orson Welles, who made Citizen Kane at 26.
Nicolas Garcia Uriburu, who dyed the waters of Venice's Grand Canal green at 30.

Among the examples he gives of experimentalists are:
Mark Twain, who wrote Adventures of Huckleberry Finn at 50.
Alfred Hitchcock, who made Vertigo at 59.

In 2008, he was awarded a Guggenheim Fellowship in fine arts research.

Comics theorist Scott McCloud seems to have anticipated some aspects of Galenson's theory in his 1993 book Understanding Comics.  

He talks about his ideas in the Shaping Business Minds Through Art podcast in 2020.

Criticisms 
Galenson's distinction between conceptual and experimental is based upon evidence from the age in which artists were most productive creatively. However, other studies have challenged that the underlying cause is not age, but are due to artistic movements which occur in certain periods. Artists in artistic movements tend to be creative regardless of their age. Thus, Galenson's theory has been criticized for overemphasizing the individual and overlooking the collective aspects in supporting creativity.

Footnotes

External links 
David Galenson's homepage
Article about him in Wired
Faculty page at University of Chicago's Department of Economics
University of Chicago Experts Guide
Arts of Innovation, which applies Galenson's approach to innovation in business, science, invention and daily life.

1951 births
21st-century American economists
Harvard College alumni
University of Texas at Austin faculty
University of Chicago faculty
Living people